The Ballacash Bank is a sand bank Northeast of the Point of Ayre, Isle of Man.

The currents around the Point of Ayre have, over the millennia formed a series banks stretching out to the east which, it is advised, should be avoided especially in heavy weather when the seas break over them.

The bank is denoted on maritime charts and marked with the West Cardinal Buoy at position . The buoy is yellow in colour with a black horizontal band. It is fitted with a light which operates a quick group flash of nine every 10 seconds.

Other notable sandbars and banks in the area are the Bahama Bank, the King William Banks, the Strunakill Bank, and the Whitestone Bank.

References

Shoals of the Isle of Man
Landforms of the Irish Sea
Fishing areas of the Atlantic Ocean